The following lists events that happened during 1998 in Namibia.

Incumbents
President: Sam Nujoma 
Prime Minister: Hage Geingob 
Chief Justice: Ismael Mahomed

Events

August
 August 10 - Military experts from Namibia, Zimbabwe, Zambia and Tanzania are due in Kinshasa later this week to investigate allegations of Rwandan and Ugandan troops being sent across the border.

September
 September 3 - South Africa now says it supports the intervention of the Democratic Republic of the Congo by Namibia, Zimbabwe and Angola, supporting Kabila.

References

 
Years of the 20th century in Namibia
1990s in Namibia
Namibia
Namibia